Events from the year 1211 in Ireland.

Incumbent
Lord: John

Events
 Walter de Lacy erected the castle on Turbet Island, Cavan, in the abortive Anglo-Norman attempt to gain control of West Ulster.

References

 
1210s in Ireland
Ireland
Years of the 13th century in Ireland